Brian Brunette is an American former professional boxer who competed from 1980 to 1986, challenging for the WBA light welterweight title in 1986.

Professional career
Brunette made his professional debut on July 7, 1980 with a second round knockout of Wayne Grant on the undercard of the Larry Holmes-Scott LeDoux match at Met Center in Bloomington, Minnesota. Brunette won his first 23 fights, 17 of them by knockout.

On September 6, 1986, Brunette squared off against undefeated champion Patrizio Oliva in Campania, Italy for Oliva's WBA light welterweight title. Brunette lost via third-round technical knockout (TKO) in a scheduled fifteen round bout, when, his manager (his brother, Tom) stepped in to protect him from a hail of lefts and rights by Oliva. He received a reported $14,500 for the fight.

Three months later Brunette returned to the ring for one last fight, defeating middleweight Billy Travers by fifth-round TKO. It was his final professional fight, as he retired at the age of 28 with a record of 24-1 with 18 wins coming by knockout.

He was managed by his brother Tommy and trained by his brother Bob.

Professional boxing record

|-
|align="center" colspan=8|24 Wins (18 knockouts, 6 decisions), 1 Loss (1 knockout, 0 decisions) 
|-
| align="center" style="border-style: none none solid solid; background: #e3e3e3"|Result
| align="center" style="border-style: none none solid solid; background: #e3e3e3"|Record
| align="center" style="border-style: none none solid solid; background: #e3e3e3"|Opponent
| align="center" style="border-style: none none solid solid; background: #e3e3e3"|Type
| align="center" style="border-style: none none solid solid; background: #e3e3e3"|Round
| align="center" style="border-style: none none solid solid; background: #e3e3e3"|Date
| align="center" style="border-style: none none solid solid; background: #e3e3e3"|Location
| align="center" style="border-style: none none solid solid; background: #e3e3e3"|Notes
|-align=center
|Win
|
|align=left|Billy Travers
|TKO
|5
|26/12/1986
|align=left| Key West High School, Key West, Florida, U.S.
|align=left|
|-
|Loss
|
|align=left| Patrizio Oliva
|TKO
|3
|06/09/1986
|align=left| Napoli, Italy
|align=left|
|-
|Win
|
|align=left| Ezequiel Sanchez
|KO
|7
|13/05/1986
|align=left| Bloomington, Minnesota, U.S.
|align=left|
|-
|Win
|
|align=left| Lalo Gimenez
|KO
|3
|31/01/1986
|align=left| Fort Lauderdale, Florida, U.S.
|align=left|
|-
|Win
|
|align=left| Jim Freeman
|TKO
|3
|26/12/1985
|align=left| Turnberry Isle Resort and Club, Miami Beach, Florida, U.S.
|align=left|
|-
|Win
|
|align=left| Steve Mitchell
|UD
|10
|10/09/1985
|align=left| Saint Paul, Minnesota, U.S.
|align=left|
|-
|Win
|
|align=left| Ken Larson
|TKO
|2
|29/05/1985
|align=left| Holiday Star Theater, Merrillville, Indiana, U.S.
|align=left|
|-
|Win
|
|align=left| Rudy Fuentes
|KO
|2
|22/11/1984
|align=left| Saint Paul, Minnesota, U.S.
|align=left|
|-
|Win
|
|align=left| Trevor Evelyn
|PTS
|10
|08/08/1984
|align=left| Saint Paul, Minnesota, U.S.
|align=left|
|-
|Win
|
|align=left| Greg Collins
|KO
|1
|13/05/1984
|align=left| Highland, Indiana, U.S.
|align=left|
|-
|Win
|
|align=left| Gary Holmgren
|SD
|10
|01/02/1984
|align=left| Saint Paul, Minnesota, U.S.
|align=left|
|-
|Win
|
|align=left| Bruce Strauss
|TKO
|6
|08/12/1983
|align=left| Saint Paul, Minnesota, U.S.
|align=left|
|-
|Win
|
|align=left| Larry Mayes
|TKO
|2
|26/10/1983
|align=left| Saint Paul, Minnesota, U.S.
|align=left|
|-
|Win
|
|align=left| Billy Doyle
|KO
|2
|26/08/1983
|align=left| Belcourt, North Dakota, U.S.
|align=left|
|-
|Win
|
|align=left| Mike Pollitt
|TKO
|4
|23/07/1983
|align=left| Saint Paul, Minnesota, U.S.
|align=left|
|-
|Win
|
|align=left|Steve Roake
|KO
|2
|07/05/1983
|align=left| Fargo, North Dakota, U.S.
|align=left|
|-
|Win
|
|align=left| Tony Akbar Taylor
|TKO
|5
|12/11/1981
|align=left| Saint Paul, Minnesota, U.S.
|align=left|
|-
|Win
|
|align=left| Larry Ward
|PTS
|8
|06/05/1981
|align=left| Saint Paul, Minnesota, U.S.
|align=left|
|-
|Win
|
|align=left| Nate Lenoir
|KO
|2
|26/02/1981
|align=left| Saint Paul, Minnesota, U.S.
|align=left|
|-
|Win
|
|align=left| Charlie Peterson
|PTS
|6
|21/01/1981
|align=left| Saint Paul, Minnesota, U.S.
|align=left|
|-
|Win
|
|align=left| Dale Gordon
|PTS
|4
|09/12/1980
|align=left| Warren, Ohio, U.S.
|align=left|
|-
|Win
|
|align=left| Darrell Ned Miller
|TKO
|2
|11/11/1980
|align=left| Saint Paul, Minnesota, U.S.
|align=left|
|-
|Win
|
|align=left| Donnie Williams
|KO
|1
|23/09/1980
|align=left| Atkinson Hotel, Indianapolis, Indiana, U.S.
|align=left|
|-
|Win
|
|align=left| Rocky Trampler
|KO
|2
|24/07/1980
|align=left| St. James Civic Centre, Winnipeg, Manitoba, Canada
|align=left|
|-
|Win
|
|align=left| Wayne Grant
|KO
|2
|07/07/1980
|align=left| Metropolitan Sports Center, Bloomington, Minnesota, U.S.
|align=left|
|}

Personal life
Brunette is a member of the Brunette family of boxers, three brothers who are co-proprietors of Brunette's Boxing Gym in Saint Paul. Brian Brunette is the business manager for the gym.

References

External links
 

1958 births
Living people
Light-middleweight boxers
Boxers from Saint Paul, Minnesota
American male boxers